Skoryatino is a rural locality (a village) in Nizhnerogodskoye Rural Settlement, Velikoustyugsky District, Vologda Oblast, Russia. The population was 8 as of 2002.

Geography 
Skoryatino is located 43 km southwest of Veliky Ustyug (the district's administrative centre) by road. Davydovskoye is the nearest rural locality.

References 

Rural localities in Velikoustyugsky District